Tuneiras do Oeste is a municipality in the state of Paraná in the Southern Region of Brazil.

The municipality contains part of the  Perobas Biological Reserve, a strictly protected conservation unit created in 2006.

See also
List of municipalities in Paraná

References

Municipalities in Paraná